The following is a list of Michigan State Historic Sites in Saginaw County, Michigan. Sites marked with a dagger (†) are also listed on the National Register of Historic Places in Saginaw County, Michigan.


Current listings

See also
 National Register of Historic Places listings in Saginaw County, Michigan

Sources
 Historic Sites Online – Saginaw County. Michigan State Housing Developmental Authority. Accessed May 30, 2011.

References

M
MSHS
Saginaw County